James Hugh Relfe (October 17, 1791 – September 14, 1863) was a U.S. Representative from Missouri.

Born in Virginia, Relfe moved to Washington County, Missouri, about 1816 with his father, who settled in Caledonia.
He received a limited schooling.
He studied medicine and practiced in Caledonia, Missouri.
He was appointed a member of the commission to adjust Spanish land claims to fill the vacancy occasioned by the resignation of his brother-in-law, Dr. Lewis F. Linn.
He served as member of the State house of representatives 1835-1844.
He served in the Black Hawk War.
He was appointed United States marshal for the district of Missouri February 17, 1841.

Relfe was elected as a Democrat to the Twenty-eighth and Twenty-ninth Congresses (March 4, 1843 – March 3, 1847).
He continued the practice of medicine in Caledonia, Washington County, Missouri, until his death there September 14, 1863.
He was interred in the Methodist Cemetery.

References

External links

1791 births
1863 deaths
American military personnel of the Indian Wars
American people of the Black Hawk War
United States Marshals
Democratic Party members of the Missouri House of Representatives
Democratic Party members of the United States House of Representatives from Missouri
19th-century American politicians
Physicians from Missouri